The stock market revived in Russia after the liberalization of the economy in 1991. The history of the stock market of the Russian Empire before 1917 was not directly related to the history of the modern Russian securities market. In the conditions of the command and distribution economy of the USSR, the movement of financial flows was determined by the decision of the party and financial and economic bodies, therefore, the conditions for the revival of the stock market, which existed before the 1917 revolution, remained unfavorable until the early 1990s. In place of the official stock market, there was only the so-called "black market".

The securities market (SM) in Russia began to revive in the first half of 1991 after the Decree of the Council of Ministers of the RSFSR No. 601 of December 25, 1990 "On approval of the Regulations on joint-stock companies" was adopted. However, for a long time the low level of financial and economic savvy of the country's population as a whole did not allow the market to develop. The situation was also complicated by privatization frauds in 1993-1994. The dynamic development of the legitimate stock market began only after the resumption of growth of the Russian economy since the early 2000s.

See also
 Russian Trading System
 Moscow Exchange

References

Further reading
 

Economy of Russia